Bedaruddin Ahmad (15 March 1927 – 1998) was a Bangladeshi musician. He was the founder principal of Bulbul Lalitakala Academy.

Early life and career
Ahmad was born in Sherpur Upazila, Bogra District to Muhammad Mohiruddin and Nekjahan Begum. He first learnt to play the harmonium from Gour Chandra Ghosh. He stood first in a children's musical contest in North Bengal in 1940.

Ahmad moved to Calcutta to study classical music from Yusuf Khan Qureshi, Mohammad Hossain Khasru and Raisuddin. He was a regular artiste of All India Radio in Caluctta.

Awards
 Bangla Academy Literary Award (1974) 
 Ekushey Padak (1980)

References

1927 births
1998 deaths
Bangladeshi male musicians
Recipients of Bangla Academy Award
Recipients of the Ekushey Padak in arts
20th-century male musicians